Jahanbakhsh may refer to:

Alireza Jahanbakhsh (b. 1993), Iranian footballer
Babak Jahanbakhsh (b. 1983), Iranian singer, composer and musician.
Qaleh-ye Jahan Bakhsh, a village in Lorestan, Iran